Cyril Suk and Daniel Vacek were the defending champions but did not compete that year.

Luke Jensen and Murphy Jensen won in the final 6–3, 7–6 against Hendrik Dreekmann and Alexander Volkov.

Seeds
Champion seeds are indicated in bold text while text in italics indicates the round in which those seeds were eliminated.

 Jared Palmer /  Jonathan Stark (semifinals)
 Martin Damm /  Nicolás Pereira (quarterfinals)
 Vince Spadea /  Jeff Tarango (first round)
 Stephen Noteboom /  Fernon Wibier (first round)

Draw

References
 1996 Genovese Hamlet Cup Doubles Draw

Connecticut Open (tennis)
1996 ATP Tour
1996 Waldbaum's Hamlet Cup